The Emerging Pathogens Institute (EPI) is an interdisciplinary research institution associated with the University of Florida. The institute focuses on fusing key disciplines to develop outreach, education and research capabilities designed to preserve the region's health and economy, as well as to prevent or contain new and re-emerging diseases. Researchers within the institute work in more than 30 different countries around the world, with over 250 affiliated faculty members stemming from 11 University of Florida colleges, centers and institutes. The 90,000-square-foot building includes laboratories and collaborative space for bioinformatics and mathematical modeling.

History
The idea of this institute was first created by the University of Florida faculty and researchers, prompted by the recognition of a need for a facility that could drive pathogen-related research in Florida. Funding for the EPI was provided by the Florida State Legislature in 2006. In 2007, Dr. J. Glenn Morris was recruited from the University of Maryland, Baltimore to serve as the founding director of the EPI. Construction on a new, dedicated 90,000-square-foot research facility was completed in 2009. The structure houses the institute and numerous top researchers, as well as the Southeastern National Tuberculosis Center (SNTC), the Southern HIV and Alcohol Research Consortium (SHARC) and one of the CDC Centers of Excellence in Vector-borne Diseases. 

In March 2009, the institute received a substantial grant from the Bill and Melinda Gates Foundation. This was the first time that the University of Florida has ever received direct funding from this foundation, and the grant was provided to help researchers develop tools to fight malaria.

Major areas of research 

 Vector-Borne Diseases
 Zika, Dengue, Chikungunya, Malaria, Tick-borne diseases
 Viral respiratory pathogens
 Coronavirus, Influenza
 Tuberculosis
 Drug-resistant TB
 Non-TB Mycobacterial Disease
 Enteric and Foodborne Illnesses
 Cholera, diarrheal disease
 Foodborne disease policy and control
 Plant Pathogens
 Antibiotic Resistance/Hospital Infection Control
 MRSA
 HIV
 Zoonoses

Global research 
The Emerging Pathogens Institute channels multidisciplinary programs focused on plant, human and animal pathogens, including viral discovery, vector-borne pathogens and, most recently, coronaviruses and pandemic preparedness. Publications include papers in top scientific journals, including Science, Nature and Proceedings of the National Academy of Sciences. Given the speed with which pathogens can move globally, work in the EPI has had a strong international focus, with collaborations in place with investigators in over 50 countries. 

EPI investigators have been involved in research on various coronavirus species for a number of years. With the onset of the pandemic, the EPI has played a role in population-based studies of COVID-19, including studies of transmission within schools. Other areas of research have included development of mathematical models predicting spread of the virus in Florida in successive pandemic waves, the critical role of aerosols in transmission of the virus and the transmission of coronaviruses of animal origin into humans.

Directors

2007–Present       J. Glenn Morris

See also 
University of Florida
Buildings at the University of Florida
Infectious Disease Pharmacokinetics Laboratory

References

External links 
Website of the Institute
Morris named Director
President Machen's Press Release
Highbeam.com article about the costs
Official UF Press Release about EPI

University of Florida
Medical research institutes in Florida
2007 establishments in Florida
Research institutes established in 2007
Organizations based in Gainesville, Florida